Alvino is both a given name and a surname. 

Notable people with the given name include:
Alvino Rey (1908–2004), American jazz guitarist and bandleader
Alvino Volpi Neto (born 1992), Brazilian goalkeeper 

Notable people with the surname include:
Enrico Alvino (1809–1872), Italian architect and urban designer
Terry Alvino (born 1984), American soccer player
Vladimir Alvino Guerrero (born 1975), Dominican baseball player